Emmanuel Cerda Martínez  (born 27 January 1987) is a former Mexican soccer striker who last played for Potros UAEM of the Ascenso MX.

Club career
Cerda began playing football with Tigres de la UANL, and made his Primera debut, on his birthday, in the Clausura 2006 tournament against Tecos UAG. He scored his first goal in the 2–1 win in the Estadio Universitario. Cerda participated in three tournaments with Tigres, making 22 appearances and scoring six goals. Tigres sent him out on loan three times during his time with the club.

Universitario's manager Juan Reynoso, who knew of Cerda from when he was playing late in his career at Necaxa, took Cerda on loan in 2009. Cerda joined Toluca on loan for the Clausura 2011. He scored 3 goals and took Jaime Ayoví's starting spot at the end of the season.

International Caps 
Updated 22 August 2007

Honours

Club
Universitario
 Primera División Peruana:
 Winner (1): 2009

Tigres UANL
 Primera División de México:
 Winner (1): Apertura 2011

References

External links
 

1987 births
Living people
Footballers from San Luis Potosí
Association football wingers
Mexico international footballers
Pan American Games bronze medalists for Mexico
Pan American Games medalists in football
Deportivo Toluca F.C. players
Tigres UANL footballers
San Luis F.C. players
Club Puebla players
Club Universitario de Deportes footballers
Club Tijuana footballers
Dorados de Sinaloa footballers
Mexican expatriate footballers
Expatriate footballers in Peru
Mexican expatriate sportspeople in Peru
Footballers at the 2007 Pan American Games
Medalists at the 2007 Pan American Games
Mexican footballers